Chen-Bo Zhu, also known as Zhu Chengbo (Chinese: 朱程波), is a Singaporean mathematician working in representation theory of Lie groups. He was Head of the Department of Mathematics at the National University of Singapore from 2014 to 2020.  Zhu served as President of the Singapore Mathematical Society from 2009 to 2012  and Vice President of the Southeast Asian Mathematical Society from 2012 to 2013.

Biography 
Born September, 1964 in Yin County  (Chinese: 鄞县, current Yinzhou District), Ningbo, Zhejiang Province in China, Zhu attended Yinzhou High School from 1978 to 1980  and studied mathematics as an undergraduate at Zhejiang University from 1980 to 1984.
In 1984, Zhu was among the 15 students nationwide selected by the Government of China and by a joint AMS-SIAM committee for PhD study in the U.S. (also known as the Shiing-Shen Chern Program). Subsequently, he went to Yale University in 1985 and obtained his PhD in 1990, under the direction of Roger Howe. Zhu joined the Department of Mathematics at NUS in 1991, and became a Singapore citizen in 1995.

Contributions 
In representation theory, Zhu’s work is focused on classical groups and their smooth representations. Jointly with Sun Binyong, he proved multiplicity at most one for the branching (also called strong Gelfand pair property) of irreducible Casselman-Wallach representations of classical groups in the Archimedean case, and the conservation relation conjecture of Stephen S. Kudla and Stephen Rallis. He has also applied Howe correspondence to the structural study of degenerate representations and to the understanding of singularities for infinite-dimensional representations.

Selected works

Awards and honors 
Zhu has been a Fellow of the Singapore National Academy of Science since 2014.

References

External links 
 Homepage of Chen-Bo Zhu
 The Mathematics Genealogy Project – Chen-Bo Zhu

1964 births
Living people
Singaporean mathematicians
Academic staff of the National University of Singapore
Educators from Ningbo
Scientists from Ningbo
Mathematicians from Zhejiang
Zhejiang University alumni
Chinese emigrants to Singapore
Yale University alumni